Douglass Township is a township in Montgomery County, Pennsylvania, United States. The population was 10,195 at the 2010 census.

Geography
It is drained by the Schuylkill River via the Perkiomen Creek. The township's villages include Congo, Englesville (also in Berks County,) Gilbertsville, Niantic, and Sassamansville (also in New Hanover Township.)

The township has a hot-summer humid continental climate (Dfa) and is in hardiness zones 6b and 7a. The average monthly temperatures in Gilbertsville range from 30.2 °F in January to 74.9 °F in July.  The average annual absolute minimum temperature in Gilbertsville is -0.5 °F.   The average monthly temperatures in Niantic range from 29.5 °F in January to 74.3 °F in July.

Neighboring municipalities
Upper Hanover Township (northeast)
New Hanover Township (southeast)
Upper Pottsgrove Township (south)
Douglass Township, Berks County (southwest)
Colebrookdale Township, Berks County (west)
Washington Township, Berks County (northwest)

Transportation

The principal routes in Douglass Township are Route 73 east-to-west and Route 100 north-to-south. These meet at an interchange in Gilbertsville and other major local roads include Congo Road, Congo-Niantic Road, County Line Road, Gilbertsville Road, Hoffmansville Road, Niantic Road, and Swamp Pike. Pottstown Area Rapid Transit (PART) provides bus service to the Gilbertsville section of the township along the Orange Line route, which heads south to Pottstown.

Demographics

As of the 2010 census, the township was 96.0% White, 1.0% Black or African American, 0.3% Native American, 1.1% Asian, and 1.2% were two or more races. 1.8% of the population were of Hispanic or Latino ancestry.

As of the census of 2000, there were 9,104 people, 3,211 households, and 2,552 families residing in the township. The population density was 593.4 people per square mile (229.1/km2). There were 3,292 housing units at an average density of 214.6/sq mi (82.9/km2). The racial makeup of the township was 97.77% White, 0.77% African American, 0.08% Native American, 0.71% Asian, 0.02% Pacific Islander, 0.14% from other races, and 0.51% from two or more races. Hispanic or Latino of any race were 0.47% of the population.

There were 3,211 households, out of which 41.8% had children under the age of 18 living with them, 66.6% were married couples living together, 9.0% had a female householder with no husband present, and 20.5% were non-families. 16.9% of all households were made up of individuals, and 7.4% had someone living alone who was 65 years of age or older. The average household size was 2.83 and the average family size was 3.20.

In the township the population was spread out, with 29.3% under the age of 18, 6.3% from 18 to 24, 31.0% from 25 to 44, 22.8% from 45 to 64, and 10.7% who were 65 years of age or older. The median age was 37 years. For every 100 females, there were 97.8 males. For every 100 females age 18 and over, there were 91.9 males.

The median income for a household in the township was $55,679, and the median income for a family was $62,404. Males had a median income of $45,728 versus $25,461 for females. The per capita income for the township was $22,476. About 2.7% of families and 2.8% of the population were below the poverty line, including 2.4% of those under age 18 and 4.9% of those age 65 or over.

Government and politics

Legislators
State Representative Donna Scheuren, Republican, 147th district
State Senator Tracy Pennycuick, Republican, 24th district
US Representative Madeleine Dean, Democrat, 4th district

Board of Supervisors
Joshua Stouch, Chairman
Tom Wynne, Vice Chairman
Dr. Alan Keiser, Supervisor

Gallery

References

External links

 Douglass Township

Townships in Montgomery County, Pennsylvania
Townships in Pennsylvania